Belomorets (Bulgarian: Беломорец) is a Bulgarian football club from the village of  Svetlen, Targovishte Province.

Description
The club is in the "B" division of OFG Targovishte-West. It was founded in 1945 with four players from the disbanded club Belomorets Kavala, founded in 1941, which had a ninth place (1/8-final) in the Bulgarian State Football Championship in 1943. The club is a long-time participant in the regional group Targovishte, and briefly played in the Northeast "V" AFG. The team was on a long hiatus through the 1990s. In the 2000/2001 season, the club entered the "A" OFG Targovishte-West and finished in fifth place. The team plays their home games at the Hadzhi Dimitar football field in Svetlen.

Football clubs in Bulgaria
Association football clubs established in 1945
1945 establishments in Bulgaria